Rhacophorus calcaneus (vernacular name: Vietnam flying frog) is a species of frog in the family Rhacophoridae. It is endemic to Vietnam. It has been extensively confused with Rhacophorus robertingeri, making it difficult to know its true range. It is threatened by  collection for the international pet trade and by habitat loss and degradation caused by rapidly expanding agriculture, including cash crops such as rubber, coffee and tea.

References

calcaneus
Amphibians of Vietnam
Endemic fauna of Vietnam
Amphibians described in 1924
Taxa named by Malcolm Arthur Smith
Taxonomy articles created by Polbot